T. B. Harms & Francis, Day, & Hunter, Inc., based in the Tin Pan Alley area of New York City, was one of the seven largest publishers of popular music in the world in 1920.  T. B. Harms & Francis, Day & Hunter, Inc. was one of seven defendants named in a 1920 Sherman antitrust suit brought by the U.S. Justice Department for controlling 80% of the music publishing business.  The seven defendants were:

 Consolidated Music Corporation – 144 W. 37th St., New York, New York
 Irving Berlin, Inc. – 1567 Broadway, New York, New York
 Leo Feist, Inc. – 231 W 40th St, New York, New York
 T. B. Harms & Francis, Day & Hunter, Inc. – 62 W. 45th St., New York, New York
 Shapiro, Bernstein & Co., Inc. – 218 W. 47th St., New York, New York
 Watterson, Berlin & Snyder, Inc. – 1571 Broadway, New York, NY (sold in bankruptcy to Mills Music in 1929)
 M. Witmark & Sons, Inc. – 144 W. 37th St, New York, New York

Founded in 1881 as the Thomas B. Harms Music Publishing Company, T. B. Harms & Francis, Day & Hunter, Inc., was eventually incorporated in New York and changed its name to Harms, Inc. in 1921.

Owners and executives 
 Thomas B. Harms (1860–1906)
 Max Dreyfus (1874–1964) (owned 25% in 1901) — The Harms empire owned or backed by Dreyfus, included Harms, Inc., Chappell-Harms (its "repository for non-production music"), De Sylva, Brown, and Henderson, Remick Music, Green and Stept, Famous Music, T. B. Harms, and George Gershwin's New World Music, publisher of all Gershwin's music" (109).
 Jerome Kern (1885–1945) — Kern plugged sheet music at a local department store then took a job with T. B. Harms, Inc., and eventually became vice president.
 Alexander T. Harms (1855–1901)
 Frederick Day (1878–1975)

History timeline

Tin Pan Alley publisher 
"Tin Pan Alley" was a specific area in New York City on 28th Street, between Broadway and 6th Avenue that, at the turn of the 20th century, was the center of the popular music publishing industry.  Many publishing firms were not actually located on that particular block, but, "Tin Pan Alley" was also as much a reference to a music industry district as it was to a music genre (popular music, ragtime – the precursor to what became jazz).  T. B. Harms & Francis, Day, & Hunter, Inc. was a Tin Pan Alley firm.

Sale to Warner Brothers 
As silent pictures evolved to talkies, Warner Brothers had aimed to build its inventory of published music.  Before the Wall Street Crash of 1929, Warner Brothers acquired Harms, Inc., using 140,364 shares of its own stock, then valued at $8,421,840.  Warner then reincorporated its acquisition under the laws of Delaware and named it Music Publishers Holding Company, Inc.  Also in 1929, Warner Brothers acquired the music publishing company of M. Witmark & Sons.

See also 
 Francis, Day & Hunter Ltd v Twentieth Century Fox Corp
 Timeline of music in the United States (1880–1919)

References 

Music publishing companies of the United States
Companies based in New York City
Publishing companies established in 1881
1881 establishments in New York (state)